Leslie Hindman Auctioneers is an American auction house based in Chicago, Illinois, United States.  Founded in 1982, sold to Sotheby's in 1997 and reopened in 2003, the company engages in auctions ranging from contemporary paintings and fine jewelry to French furniture and rare books and manuscripts.

Company history 
In 1982, Leslie Hindman founded her eponymous auction house in Chicago, Illinois, and within a few years it grew to be the largest auction house in the Midwest and the fifth largest in the country. The company conducted many significant and highly publicized auctions, including memorabilia from the historic Comiskey Park, the Chicago Stadium, the Schwinn Family Bicycle Collection, as well as the personal property from such renowned estates as Arthur Rubloff, Mrs. Robert R. McCormick, the Potter Palmer families, and Dole heiress Elizabeth F. Cheney.

In 1991, Hindman gained international recognition for the discovery of a previously unknown still life by Vincent van Gogh. The painting sold for $1.43 million.

Since reopening, it has handled property from the estates of Leo S. Guthman, Mrs. Jacob Baur (Bertha Baur), Rose Movius Palmer, Melville N. Rothchild, Sally Fairweather, Helen C. Tunison, Frank J. and Mary Mackey Jr., and Dr. Reid I. Martin among others. Additionally, Leslie Hindman Auctioneers has handled property belonging to Leona Helmsley, the Kenan Heise collection of books and manuscripts, property from the Akron Art Museum, The Art Institute of Chicago, The Milwaukee Art Museum, the Scottish Rite Bodies: Valley of Chicago, the Kmart art collection, the Kemper Insurance Companies corporate art collection, sports memorabilia from the legendary Ernie Harwell, music and movie memorabilia from Eric "Mancow" Muller, and the John Drury collection of A.C. Gilbert Erector Sets and Mysto Magic Sets.

Leslie Hindman biography
Leslie attended Pine Manor College, the University of Paris (also known as the Sorbonne), and Indiana University, and has received an honorary Doctorate in Business Administration from Lincoln College in Lincoln, Illinois. She is the recipient of many awards, including the YWCA Entrepreneur of the Year Award and the National Association of Women Business Owners Woman of Achievement Award.

For eight years, she was  host of two television shows on the Home & Garden Television Network (HGTV), At the Auction with Leslie Hindman and The Appraisal Fair, which were viewed in more than 80 million homes across the United States. She also wrote a weekly syndicated column for the Chicago Tribune called "What’s It Worth?" In February 2001, her critically acclaimed book, Adventures at the Auction, was published by Clarkson Potter, a division of Random House.
 
In December 2004, she served as Chairperson of the Great Chicago Fire Sale, the first-ever citywide eBay auction led by Commissioner Lois Weisberg and the Chicago Department of Cultural Affairs. The auction grossed over $240,000 which was used to support free programs at the Chicago Cultural Center, Gallery 37, the city's cultural grants and the Clarke House Museum.

Hindman serves on the Boards of the Chicago Public Library Foundation, the Goodman Theatre, Children's Memorial Foundation, the Arts Club of Chicago, and the Woman's Board of the Joffrey Ballet.

References

External links
 Company website

Companies based in Chicago
American companies established in 1982
Retail companies established in 1982
American auction houses
1982 establishments in Illinois